Hildburghausen is a district in Thuringia, Germany. It is bounded by (from the west and clockwise) the district of Schmalkalden-Meiningen, the city of Suhl, the districts of Ilm-Kreis, Saalfeld-Rudolstadt and Sonneberg, and the state of Bavaria (districts of Coburg, Haßberge and Rhön-Grabfeld). Located roughly halfway between the mountain chains of the Rhön and the Thuringian Forest, the district is densely forested and covered by hilly countryside. Its territory is similar to that of the former Ernestine duchy, Saxe-Hildburghausen.

Towns and municipalities

Coat of arms
The coat of arms displays:
 the heraldic lion of Meißen, the precursor state to Saxony
 the cock representing the counts of Henneberg, who ruled the region until 1583
 below the symbol of the bishopric of Würzburg is displayed

References

External links
  Official website